Shmuel Berenbaum (March 13, 1920 – January 6, 2008) was an Orthodox rabbi and rosh yeshiva of the Mir yeshiva in Brooklyn, New York.

Biography
He was born in Knyszyn, Poland and studied at Ohel Torah Yeshiva in Baranowicze, led by Rabbi Elchonon Wasserman. He later studied in the Mir Yeshiva located in the town of Mir, now in Belarus. At the onset of World War II, he traveled with the rest of the Mir Yeshiva to Vilna, where they remained for three weeks awaiting visas to travel abroad. After receiving destination visas to Curaçao, a Dutch protectorate in the Caribbean, they were given travel visas by the Japanese Consul in Kovno, Chiune Sugihara. The yeshiva traveled across the Trans-Siberian Railway to Vladivostok in a trip that took over two months. From there they traveled to Kobe, Japan, where they remained for 7 months before being settled by the Japanese Government in Shanghai, China.

Following the war, Berenbaum traveled with the remnants of the Mir Yeshiva to the United States and settled in Brooklyn, New York. He married the eldest daughter of the Mir rosh yeshiva, Rabbi Avraham Kalmanowitz.

In 1964, after the passing of his father-in-law, he became the rosh yeshiva of the Mirrer Yeshiva together with his brother-in-law Rabbi Shraga Moshe Kalmanowitz. His diligence in Torah study was legendary and he was known to spend the entire day in the yeshiva's study hall discussing Torah topics with the students.

As a policy, he would not attend any functions or weddings until after the afternoon seder in the yeshiva was over. This caused many weddings to take place late in the evening so as to allow him to officiate. He opposed his yeshiva students going to college, and later banned it outright.  Some believe that he allowed the students to study for rabbinic ordination in order to satisfy their parents, who would otherwise want their children to attend college.

After Berenbaum's first heart attack, the name Refoel was added to his name.

Death

Berenbaum died on January 6, 2008 (28 Tevet 5768) at his home in Brooklyn from medical complications due to stomach cancer, aged 87. His funeral, held on January 7 at the Mir yeshiva, was attended by tens of thousands of mourners. His body was flown to Israel for burial in the Sanhedria Cemetery in Jerusalem.

References

External links 
 Pictures and Audio from  HaRav Shmuel Berenbaum
 Picture of HaRav Shmuel Berenbaum
 Speech of HaRav Shmuel Berenbaum

1920 births
2008 deaths
20th-century Polish rabbis
American Haredi rabbis
Burials at Sanhedria Cemetery
Deaths from cancer in New York (state)
Deaths from stomach cancer
Orthodox rabbis from New York City
People from Knyszyn
People from Midwood, Brooklyn
Polish emigrants to the United States
Mir rosh yeshivas
Mir Yeshiva alumni